Dadgar is a monthly Persian language law magazine published in Toronto, Ontario, Canada. It was launched in 2013. Contributors of the magazine are mostly journalists and legal advisors who publish articles on legal system changes in Canada and social and legal issues related to Iranian-Canadians. It offers both Persian and English language articles.

References

External links

2013 establishments in Ontario
Bilingual magazines
Legal magazines
Magazines published in Toronto
Magazines established in 2013
Monthly magazines published in Canada
Persian-language magazines